A trade agreement (also known as trade pact) is a wide-ranging taxes, tariff and trade treaty that often includes investment guarantees. It exists when two or more countries agree on terms that help them trade with each other. The most common trade agreements are of the preferential and free trade types, which are concluded in order to reduce (or eliminate) tariffs, quotas and other trade restrictions on items traded between the signatories.

The logic of formal trade agreements is that they outline what is agreed upon and the punishments for deviation from the rules set in the agreement. Trade agreements therefore make misunderstandings less likely, and create confidence on both sides that cheating will be punished; this increases the likelihood of long-term cooperation. An international organization, such as the IMF, can further incentivize cooperation by monitoring compliance with agreements and reporting third countries of the violations. Monitoring by international agencies may be needed to detect non-tariff barriers, which are disguised attempts at creating trade barriers.

Trade pacts are frequently politically contentious since they may change economic customs and deepen interdependence with trade partners. Regulatory changes may also be contentious. For instance, trade agreements have been used by nicotine- and alcohol-industry lobbyists to block, delay, and weaken public health measures like health warning labels. Free trade agreements have also attempted to regulate internet use, extend and strengthen legal monopolies, and change criminal law, privacy law, healthcare, labour law, and environmental law. Increasing efficiency through "free trade" is a common goal. For the most part, governments are supportive of further trade agreements.

There have been however some concerns expressed by the WTO. According to Pascal Lamy, Director-General of the WTO, the proliferation of regional trade agreements (RTAs) "...is breeding concern — concern about incoherence, confusion, exponential increase of costs for business, unpredictability and even unfairness in trade relations." The position of the WTO is that while the typical trade agreements (called preferential or regional by the WTO) are useful to a degree, it is much more beneficial to focus on global agreements in the WTO framework such as the negotiations of the current Doha round.

The anti-globalization movement opposes such agreements almost by definition, but some groups normally allied within that movement, e.g. green parties, seek fair trade or safe trade provisions that moderate real and perceived ill effects of globalization.

Classification of trade pacts

By number and type of signatories
There are three different types of trade agreements. The first is unilateral trade agreement, this is what happens when a country wants certain restrictions to be enforced but no other countries want them to be imposed. This also allows countries to decrease the amount of trade restrictions. That is also something that does not happen often and could impair a country.

The second is classified as bilateral (BTA) when signed between two sides, where each side could be a country (or other customs territory), a trade bloc or an informal group of countries (or other customs territories). Both countries loosen their trade restrictions to help businesses, so that they can prosper better between the different countries. This definitely helps lower taxes and it helps them converse about their trade status. Usually, this revolves around subsided domestic industries. Mainly the industries fall under automotive, oil, or food industries.

A trade agreement signed between more than two sides (typically neighboring or in the same region) is classified as multilateral. These face the most obstacles- when negotiating substance, and for implementation. The more countries that are involved, the harder it is to reach mutual satisfaction. Once this type of trade agreement is settled on, it becomes a very powerful agreement. The larger the GDP of the signatories, the greater the impact on other global trade relationships. The largest multilateral trade agreement is the North American Free Trade Agreement between the United States, Canada, and Mexico.

By geographical region 
These are between countries in a certain area. The most powerful ones include a few countries that are near each other in a geographical area. These countries often have similar histories, demographics and economic goals.

The North American Free Trade Agreement (NAFTA) was established on January 1, 1989, between the United States, Canada, and Mexico. This agreement was designed to reduce tariff barriers in North America.

The Eurasian Economic Union (EAEU) was established in 2015 and currently consists of five member states: Armenia, Belarus, Kazakhstan, Kyrgyzstan, and Russia. It is designed to foster economic integration among its member states and promote economic growth in the region. 

The Association of Southeast Asian Nations (ASEAN) was formed in 1967 between the countries of Indonesia, Malaysia, the Philippines, Singapore, and Thailand. It was established to promote political partnership and maintain economic stability throughout the region.

By level of integration

There are a variety of trade agreements; with some being quite complex (European Union), while others are less intensive (North American Free Trade Agreement). The resulting level of economic integration depends on the specific type of trade pacts and policies adopted by the trade bloc:

 Separate
Trade and Investment Framework Agreement (TIFA)
Bilateral Investment Treaty (BIT)
Preferential Trade Arrangement (PTA)–limited scope and depth of tariffs reduction between the customs territories.
Free Trade Agreement establishing a Free Trade Area (FTA)–extensive reduction or elimination of tariffs on substantially all trade allowing for the free movement of goods and in more advanced agreements also reduction of restrictions on investment and establishment allowing for the free movement of capital and free movement of services
Common market–FTA with significantly reduced or eliminated restrictions on the freedom of movement of all factors of production, including free movement of labour and of enterprise; and coordination in economic policy
Currency union–sharing the same currency
 Composite
Customs union–FTA with common external tariffs of all signatories in respect to non-signatory countries
Customs and monetary union–Customs union with Currency union
Economic union–Customs union with Common market
Economic and monetary union (EMU)–Economic union with Currency Union
Fiscal union–common coordination of substantial parts of the fiscal policies (proposed step between EMU and Complete economic integration)

Special agreements

World Trade Organization treaty
agreements in the WTO framework (Textile Agreement and others)
 the now defunct Multilateral Agreement on Investment (in the OECD framework)

By the World Trade Organization
Typically the benefits and obligations of the trade agreements apply only to their signatories.

In the framework of the World Trade Organization, different agreement types are concluded (mostly during new member accessions), whose terms apply to all WTO members on the so-called most-favored basis (MFN), which means that beneficial terms agreed bilaterally with one trading partner will apply also to the rest of the WTO members.

All agreements concluded outside of the WTO framework (and granting additional benefits beyond the WTO MFN level, but applicable only between the signatories and not to the rest of the WTO members) are called preferential by the WTO. According to WTO rules, these agreements are subject to certain requirements such as notification to the WTO and general reciprocity (the preferences should apply equally to each of the signatories of the agreement) where unilateral preferences (some of the signatories gain preferential access to the market of the other signatories, without lowering their own tariffs) are allowed only under exceptional circumstances and as temporary measure.

The trade agreements called preferential by the WTO are also known as regional (RTA), despite not necessarily concluded by countries within a certain region. There are currently 205 agreements in force as of July 2007. Over 300 have been reported to the WTO. The number of FTA has increased significantly over the last decade. Between 1948 and 1994, the General Agreement on Tariffs and Trade (GATT), the predecessor to the WTO, received 124 notifications. Since 1995 over 300 trade agreements have been enacted.

The WTO is further classifying these agreements in the following types:

Goods covering:
 basic preferential trade agreement (a.k.a. partial scope agreement)
free trade agreement
customs union
Services covering:
Economic Integration Agreement–any agreement, including a basic PTA, that covers also services

See also

 Trade and development
 Trade creation
 Trade preference
 Permanent Normal Trade Relations (PNTR)

Lists:
 List of international trade topics
 List of free trade agreements
 List of trade blocs

References

External links 
ITC's Market Access Map, an online database of customs tariffs and market requirements.

Agreement